Volodymyr Soroka (born 25 December 1982, in Kiev) is a Ukrainian judoka. He won the gold medal in the under–73 kg category at the 2009 European Judo Championships in Tbilisi, Georgia, and the silver at the 2012 European Championships.  At the 2012 Olympics, he reached the third round.

References

External links
 
 

1982 births
Living people
Sportspeople from Kyiv
Ukrainian male judoka
Olympic judoka of Ukraine
Judoka at the 2012 Summer Olympics